The 1955 West Riding County Council election was held on Saturday, 2 April 1955. The election took place in the administrative county of the West Riding of Yorkshire, which excluded the county boroughs of Barnsley, Bradford, Dewsbury, Doncaster, Halifax, Huddersfield, Leeds, Rotherham, Sheffield, Wakefield and York. The whole council of ninety-six members was up for election, with each county electoral division returning one councillor.

After the election the composition of the council was;
Labour Party: 44
Conservative Party: 37
Independents: 13
Liberal Party: 2

Results by division
The winning candidates in each division are shown in the table below.

References 

1955
West Riding County Council election
West Riding County Council election
West Riding County Council election